Crank Caverns is the common name of the remains of the Rainford Delph Quarry near Crank in St. Helens, Merseyside, England. It is a network of tunnels and caverns, as well as an extensive woodland. Information in the St. Helens local history archives states that sandstone  quarrying began here as early as 1730. As the quarry expanded, the cost of purchasing land to open cast mine it increased, so it was decided to opt for a different method. Instead of quarrying out the stone, they would mine it out, following a seam of stone until it ran out. This resulted in the network of caves, tunnels and shafts we see today. Rainford Delph is listed as a Colliery by 1854, under the ownership of Charles Howarth or Yorkshire Charlie as he was known locally by 1880. Mining finally ceased and the woods and caverns were used as a game reserve by the Earl of Derby until 1939, when they became a storage facility for ammunition for the anti-aircraft position at Crank. After the war, the caverns ceased use as a game reserve. Today, Crank Caverns are not officially open to the publicand due to their increasing instability, attempts have been made to close access to the caverns and tunnels themselves. Despite this, the site is still physically accessible from a nearby public footpath and is still a draw for generations of curious locals who wish to explore, many having heard the numerous local myths and legends from an early age.

Caverns
The mines are an example of pillar and stall mining, with the roof having support provided by pillars of stone left in place when mining was taking place. There are two sets of caverns, the first and most noticeable caves have seven portals and lead down into a large cavern. To the back and to the left of this was a roadway which was sealed in 1948. Beyond the roadway is an extensive network of tunnels, with access being possible from secure location. The other set of caves lies north west of the first set. These caves lie at the bottom of a deep ditch. One is simply a short tunnel, the other leads into a deeper set of caves. The entrance to the deeper set of caves is gated.

Myths and legends
There are numerous myths and legends associated with the caverns. The most well known is that during the Reformation local Catholics being persecuted by King Henry VIII (1491–1547) took shelter in the caverns and conducted secret mass there, but mining on the quarry only began in about 1730. Some stories report the caves running to, amongst other places, Up Holland in Lancashire, Church of St Mary, Lowe House in St. Helens and Moss Bank in St. Helens, another stated that there was in fact a tunnel running some seven miles from St Helens Town Hall to Crank Caverns in order to conduct 'secret' hangings.

"Vicious dwarves" were once rumoured to inhabit a labyrinth of caverns in Crank. In the late 18th century four children decided to explore the sandstone caverns and vanished. One child survived and told a story about small old men with beards who killed his three friends and chased him. The petrified child stumbled over human bones in the caves and finally managed to scramble through an opening to the surface as a hand was grabbing at his ankle. The authorities were concerned because a number of people had gone missing in the area near the cave entrances. Two heavily armed soldiers descended into the caverns with torches and claimed that they not only found a heap of human bones, they also found the ruins of an ancient church of some unknown denomination. The interior of the church was lit by three large candles and grotesque gargoyles formed part of an altar. Throughout the exploration of the underground, the soldiers said they felt as if they were being watched, and also heard voices speaking in an unknown language. One report said that a child's head was found in a cave, along with evidence of cannibalism. After a second investigation, the caves either collapsed or gunpowder was used to seal them.

See also
Woolton Quarry

References

External links
About St.Helens – has photographs at end of page

Caves of Merseyside
Rainford